SS Benjamin Harrison was a Liberty ship built in the United States during World War II. She was named after Benjamin Harrison, an American planter and merchant, a revolutionary leader, and a Founding Father of the United States. She served a year from March 1942 to March 1943, when she was attacked and scuttled.

Construction
Benjamin Harrison was laid down on 27 September 1941, under a Maritime Commission (MARCOM) contract, MCE hull 26, by the Bethlehem-Fairfield Shipyard, Baltimore, Maryland; and was launched on 24 January 1942.

History
She was allocated to Calmar Steamship Corporation, on 13 March 1942.

Sinking
She was loaded with stores for Allied forces in North Africa and sailed from Hampton Roads on 4 March 1943, with Convoy UGS 6. Benjamin Harrison was struck in the #5 hold on the starboard side and began to slowly settle, but did not sink quickly. As the crew began to abandon ship, confusion caused the two of the lifeboats to be improperly launched, allowing the occupants to be dropped into the ocean. Only one lifeboat was launched successfully, due to the last boat being damaged in the torpedo attack. Two officers and an Armed guard perished.

Further reading
 Rohwer, J. and Hummelchen, G. Chronology of the War at Sea 1939–1945 Naval Institute Press 1992 
 Hague, Arnold The Allied Convoy System 1939–1945 Naval Institute Press 2000

References

Bibliography

 
 
 
 
 

 

Liberty ships
World War II shipwrecks in the Atlantic Ocean
1942 ships
Maritime incidents in March 1943
Ships sunk by German submarines in World War II